Giulio Donati (born 5 February 1990) is an Italian professional footballer who plays as a right-back for  club Monza.

Club career

Inter Milan

Primavera and first team 
Born in Pietrasanta, the Province of Lucca, Donati started his career at hometown club Lucchese. In July 2008, he was signed by Inter Milan and played for its Primavera team (under-20 youth team).

At the start of 2009–10 season, Donati was called up to the first team for a number of friendlies. On 16 December 2009, he made his debut against Livorno at Coppa Italia. With both teams resting numbers of regular starters, the match ended in a 1–0 win. He subsequently also received call ups to the next two competitive matches (against Lazio and Chievo) and started a mid-season friendly.

Loan to Lecce 
On 25 June 2010, he was loaned to newly promoted Serie A team Lecce with option to sign him in a co-ownership deal. He made 16 appearances for Lecce in a season in which the Salentini were relegated. He was also a regular for the Italian u20 and u21 sides during the season. Lecce did not take up the option to sign him on a co-ownership deal.

Loan to Padova 
Donati spend the 2011–12 season on loan at Serie B side Calcio Padova. On 25 August, he made his Serie B debut with Padova in the away draw against Sampdoria. There he found regular first team football and made a total of 30 appearances.

Loan to Grosseto 
The 2012–13 season was another in which Donati was sent on loan again to a Serie B side, this time U.S. Grosseto F.C. He made 27 appearances for Grosseto and made two assists throughout the course of the season.

Bayer Leverkusen
On 21 June 2013, Bayer Leverkusen agreed a fee of €3m with Inter Milan.
He took part in 23 of the 34 Bundesliga games in the 2013–14 season, assisting once in a 2–1 win over Hertha BSC. He also made six UEFA Champions League appearances in a run that saw Bayer knocked out by Paris Saint-Germain in the round of 16.

Mainz 05
He signed for Mainz 05 on 25 January 2016 on a contract running until 2019 for an undisclosed fee. He left the club at the end of the 2018–19 season after his contract expired.

Return to Lecce
On 16 December 2019, Donati joined Serie A club Lecce after eight years. He played 20 league games, scoring one goal.

Monza
On 12 August 2020, Donati moved to newly-promoted Serie B side Monza on a three-year contract.

Career statistics

Club

References

1990 births
Living people
People from Pietrasanta
Sportspeople from the Province of Lucca
Footballers from Tuscany
Italian footballers
Association football fullbacks
S.S.D. Lucchese 1905 players
Inter Milan players
U.S. Lecce players
Calcio Padova players
F.C. Grosseto S.S.D. players
Bayer 04 Leverkusen players
1. FSV Mainz 05 players
A.C. Monza players
Serie A players
Serie B players
Bundesliga players
Italy youth international footballers
Italy under-21 international footballers
Italian expatriate footballers
Italian expatriate sportspeople in Germany
Expatriate footballers in Germany